Narciso Eloy Bartolome Ortiz Campos (born 24 March 1961) is a Peruvian former professional footballer who played as a forward for clubs of Peru and Chile.

Career
Ortiz was born in Lima, Peru. He began his career in Sporting Cristal in 1979, was part of the champion team of the following years alternated in the lead with consecrated as Juan Carlos Oblitas, Oswaldo Ramirez and Percy Rojas. He also played for the Unión Huaral and FBC Melgar in their country.

He also played many years in the Chilean football, highlighting its passage by Deportes Antofagasta, Santiago Wanderers, Unión La Calera, Audax Italiano, San Marcos de Arica and Deportes Santa Cruz, although only played in the rise of Chilean football, with the aforementioned clubs.

Personal life
He is the uncle of Chilean footballer João Ortiz.

Clubs
 Sporting Cristal 1978–1982
 Unión Huaral 1983
 FBC Melgar 1984–1985
 Juventud La Palma 1986
 Deportes Antofagasta 1987
 Santiago Wanderers 1988
 Unión La Calera 1989
 Audax Italiano 1990–1992
 San Marcos de Arica 1993–1995
 Deportes Santa Cruz 1996–1997

Honours
Sporting Cristal
 Peruvian Primera División: 1979, 1980

References

External links
 

1961 births
Living people
Peruvian footballers
Association football forwards
Sporting Cristal footballers
Primera B de Chile players
FBC Melgar footballers
Audax Italiano footballers
Unión La Calera footballers
San Marcos de Arica footballers
Deportes Santa Cruz footballers
C.D. Antofagasta footballers
Santiago Wanderers footballers
Peruvian expatriate footballers
Peruvian expatriate sportspeople in Chile
Expatriate footballers in Chile